Dhanop is an ancient village in Bhilwara district on Shahpur-Vijainagar state highway at a distance of 85 km from Bhilwara city in Rajasthan. Its PIN code is 311023. Dhanop village is in Phooliya Kalan tehsil(pin code 311407). It had a population of 3,592 at the 2001 census, out of them 616 are Scheduled Caste and 30 Scheduled tribe people. It is known for Dhanop sheetla Mata Temple.

References 

Hindu temples in Rajasthan
Villages in Bhilwara district